Sepia pulchra is a species of cuttlefish native to the southeastern Atlantic Ocean, specifically off the Cape Peninsula in South Africa. It lives at depths of between 15 and 50 m.

The type specimen was collected off Llandudno, Cape Peninsula. It is deposited at the South African Museum in Cape Town.

Description
Sepia pulchra grows to a mantle length of 22 mm. It has a warty mantle and is reddish-brown in colour with a large purple patch on the back. It has fins of variable width, which are usually fairly wide, beginning relatively far back on the body. There are three-pronged cirri over each eye.

Ecology
This cuttlefish is usually found on vertical surface, with its head facing downwards. It is seldom spotted because of its excellent camouflage.

References

External links

Cuttlefish
Molluscs described in 1985